Guerra de Titanes (Spanish for "War of the Titans") was a professional wrestling event produced by the Lucha Libre AAA World Wide (AAA) promotion, The event took place on December 2, 2018, in Aguascalientes, Aguascalientes, Mexico. The event was the twenty-second Guerra de Titanes end of the year show promoted by AAA since 1997. This was the final event broadcast by Televisa because the company left on February 1, 2019 after 27 years.

Background
Starting in 1997 the Mexican professional wrestling, company AAA has held a major wrestling show late in the year, either November or December, called Guerra de Titanes ("War of the Titans"). The show often features championship matches or Lucha de Apuestas or bet matches where the competitors risked their wrestling mask or hair on the outcome of the match. In Lucha Libre the Lucha de Apuetas match is considered more prestigious than a championship match and a lot of the major shows feature one or more Apuesta matches. The Guerra de Titanes show is hosted by a new location each year, emanating from cities such as Madero, Chihuahua, Chihuahua, Mexico City, Guadalajara, Jalisco and more. In 2016 AAA moved the Guerra de Titanes show to January, with the 2017 version continuing that trend.

Storylines
The Guerra de Titanes show will feature eight professional wrestling matches with different wrestlers involved in pre-existing scripted feuds, plots and storylines. Wrestlers portrayed either heels (referred to as rudos in Mexico, those that portray the "bad guys") or faces (técnicos in Mexico, the "good guy" characters) as they followed a series of tension-building events, which culminated in a wrestling match or series of matches.

Results

See also
2018 in professional wrestling

References

2018 in professional wrestling
Guerra de Titanes
December 2018 events in Mexico